William Craik (October 31, 1761 – February 9, 1807) was an American lawyer and planter who served as a United States representative from Maryland and as a state judge.

Early and family life
Born near Port Tobacco, Maryland, the son of prominent physician Dr. James Craik, surgeon of the Continental Army and later President George Washington's personal physician, Craik attended Delameve School in Frederick County and later studied law. He married Ann (1784–1806), daughter of prominent Virginia planter and patriot William Fitzhugh.

Career

Admitted to the bar, Craik commenced practice in Port Tobacco and Leonardtown. In 1788, he was a delegate to the states convention that ratified the U.S. Constitution.

Craik also farmed in Charles County using enslaved labor, owning 23 slaves in Charles County in 1790. He moved to Baltimore and was appointed chief justice of the fifth judicial district of Maryland on January 13, 1793, and served until his resignation in 1796.

Craik was elected as a Federalist to the Fourth Congress to fill the vacancy caused by the resignation of Jeremiah Crabb; he was reelected to the Fifth and Sixth Congresses and served from December 5, 1796, to March 3, 1801; again appointed chief justice of the fifth judicial district of Maryland and served from October 20, 1801, to January 28, 1802. During this time he resided in Frederick, Maryland,

Death and legacy
He died in Alexandria, Virginia in 1807, months after his wife, and was buried at her father's estate in nearby Fairfax County.

References

1761 births
1807 deaths
Maryland state court judges
Federalist Party members of the United States House of Representatives from Maryland
People of colonial Maryland
People from Charles County, Maryland
People from Frederick, Maryland